Ken James (born 16 November 1948) is an Australian actor and celebrity chef. He is most widely known to Australian and international audiences as Sonny's older brother Mark Hammond in the 1960s children's TV show, Skippy. Since his debut in Skippy, James continued to work in the film industry for another 36 years. In December 2009, James was diagnosed with stage three non-Hodgkin lymphoma, which escalated to stage four by 2011. James started chemotherapy, and as of November 2020 the cancer is in recession. James was also actively involved in the Victorian Police Force as an unsworn member from 1993 to 2013.

Early life and education

James was born in Sydney on 16 November 1948 and finished his schooling at Cleveland Street Boys High School. During his time at school, James became particularly interested in school plays, which acted as an impetus to join the acting industry. At the age of 12, a neighbour showed him an advertisement in a newspaper calling for young child actors/models to join the agency. The same year, in 1960, James appeared in the children's drama The Adventurers produced for ATN-7 Sydney as his first acting role.

Career
James has acted in multiple film roles, TV series, musicals and theatre plays, as well as appearing on various game and news shows. After Skippy had ended in 1970, James was still on a contract with Fauna Productions for another 12 months, and was cast to play Kip Young in Barrier Reef in 1971. James had his 21st birthday during the production of the TV show.

Once Barrier Reef had ended after 1 season, James had recurring roles as television actor Tony Wild in The Box from 1974 to 1977, Tom Walker in Glenview High from 1977 to 1979, air traffic controller Simon Young in Skyways from 1979 to 1980, and Mike O'Brien in Sons and Daughters from 1984 to 1985. He has also appeared in Matlock Police, Pugwall, Prisoner, and made guest appearances in multiple other TV shows.

James is passionate about cooking and has worked on Good Morning Australia with Bert Newton for over 10 years as a celebrity chef. He was also involved in the marketing campaign of the cooking aid Ecopot.

James worked as a drama tutor at the Australian Television Academy for 10 years, and also as a Master of Ceremonies for the Royal Children's hospital, weddings and private functions after a friend John Knowles suggested it and put an ad in the yellow pages. James didn't receive much work as an MC, although he was the Master of Ceremonies for John Knowles' remarriage wedding.

James worked as an adjudicator at the Ararat One Act Play Festival in August 2013, awarding first prize to Erica Smith and Jeanette and Meg Dunn, who performed Snuffuff's Emporium of Odds, Sods and Collectibles at Nuworks Theatre.

In August 2013, James was involved in the filming of a comedic advertisement for Sport Rider Pride Mobility Scooter on the original grounds of the Skippy set, Sydney's Waratah Park. The comedic advert involved James hurting his back while repairing a motor bike in front of the Ranger's headquarters. Geoff Harvey then rides into the scene on a Pride Mobility Scooter and convinces James to try riding it. James' on scene grandson tells James and Harvey that 'Jerry' is at the gate and needs help, before the two drive off scene on mobility scooters.

James' last acting role was in the play Ladies Night in 2012 alongside Steven Tandy and Alli Pope produced by Jally Entertainment.  The Australia tour of the play was six months long, and began with a fundraiser Gympie, Queensland for the charity Little Haven. After the initial fundraiser, the cast went on to perform in 52 other locations.

After the conclusion of the Ladies Night tour, James directed Calendar Girls for Jally Entertainment in January and February 2013.

Skippy the Bush Kangaroo
At the age of 16, four years after joining the acting industry, James was cast as Mark Hammond in the pilot episode of the classic Australian TV show Skippy. Despite this, the series had not been confirmed at the time. At the same time, James had also been offered a scholarship to the National Institute of Dramatic Art (NIDA), which he accepted. James left NIDA after four days as the Skippy series had been confirmed. He then began playing Mark Hammond for Skippy over the next three and a half years, starring in 91 episodes. Skippy was screened in 128 countries and is still screened around the world today. James' co-star Garry Pankhurst was cast as Sonny in Skippy at the age of 10 and left the acting industry after the show had finished 3 years later, as he was overwhelmed by the adulation received from being a child actor. Despite this, James still praises Pankhurst, saying "The camera loved him, and he was very photogenic. He also had a photographic memory; he could look at a page of dialogue and get it down like "bang". He was extremely natural."

James and other cast members of Skippy were not paid residuals from the TV show. Because of this, Tony Bonner had a falling out with the producers and moved to England to continue working in the acting industry. James has also expressed his own distress of not being paid residuals from the producers of Skippy.

The debut of Skippy was seen as widely controversial in a 1968 context, following the assassination of Robert F Kennedy and Martin Luther King. James believes this was because "We [Australia] weren’t that sophisticated, quite frankly, when you look at the world stage."

Personal life
James has two children from his first marriage of 24 years. In 2001, James met Rosemarie Stuhlener, a retired Telstra manager who lives in Geelong, and the two were engaged in 2003. James and Stuhlener were married in 2011. James and Stuhlener do not live with each other and do not intend to, making them a living apart together couple.

James has made contributions to multiple charities including Life Education, Variety, and Bali's Jodie O’Shea Orphanage.

James was diagnosed with stage 3 non-Hodgkin lymphoma in 2009 after he noticed a lump on his neck while shaving. This cancer then escalated to stage 4 and spread to his bones in 2011, requiring radiotherapy and chemotherapy in order to be treated. James began a chemotherapy course in April 2011 and is now cancer-free, after successfully completing chemotherapy. His diagnosis followed the cancer death of former Skippy cast member Ed Devereaux (oesophagus) in December 2003, and the diagnoses of other Skippy cast members Liza Goddard (breast) and Tony Bonner (prostate) in 1997 and 2004 respectively.

Involvement in the Victorian Police Force 
James was involved in the Victorian Police Force as an unsworn police officer for over 20 years, from 1993 to 2013. He originally assisted the Victorian Police Force in Detective Training School through role-playing in crime re-enactments. James played a bank manager who was robbed, as well as a witness to a sexual assault. James believes in 'the thin blue line', and after asking, was later given permission by the Chief Commissioner of the Victorian Police Force at the time, Neil Comrie, to give a 1-hour pro bono lecture on police and detective communication skills with the public and motivation, which he delivered from 1993 to 2013. James has received multiple certificates of appreciation from the Victorian Police Force in regard to his lectures on communication and motivation.

Filmography

References

External links

1948 births
Living people
Male actors from Sydney
Australian male television actors
Australian television chefs